The Leán River is a river on the northern Caribbean coast of Honduras slightly to the east of Tela, bordering the Punta Izopo National Park, in Atlántida Department.

See also
List of rivers of Honduras

References

Rivers of Honduras